Royal Phnom Penh Airways was an airline based in Phnom Penh, Cambodia. It operated domestic services, as well as regional flights to Thailand out of Phnom Penh International Airport and Angkor International Airport, Siem Reap.

History 
The airline was established on 24 October 1999 and began international services on 28 December 2000. It was wholly owned by Prince Norodom Chakrapong. It was planned to extend international services to Ho Chi Minh City, to China and to Singapore, but the airline was shut down in 2004.

Services 
At closure, Royal Phnom Penh Airways operated the following services:

References

External links

Defunct airlines of Cambodia
Airlines established in 1999
Airlines disestablished in 2004
2004 disestablishments in Asia
Cambodian companies established in 1999